Krist Anthony Novoselic (born May 16, 1965) is an American musician and activist. He was the bassist and co-founder of the rock band Nirvana.

Novoselic and Kurt Cobain formed the band Nirvana in 1987 along with drummer Aaron Burckhard, whom they recruited. Through the late 1980s, Nirvana established themselves as part of  the Seattle grunge scene and in 1989 they released their debut album Bleach. Nirvana went through a succession of drummers until 1990, when Dave Grohl joined after his former band Scream broke up. After signing with major record label DGC Records, Nirvana released their second studio album Nevermind in 1991. The band achieved worldwide fame through the success of Nevermind and the lead track off the album, "Smells Like Teen Spirit". Nirvana released In Utero in 1993, their third studio album, which was also a major success. Nirvana abruptly ended in 1994 following the death of Kurt Cobain.

After Nirvana disbanded, Novoselic formed Sweet 75 in 1995 and Eyes Adrift in 2002, releasing one album with each band. From 2006 to 2009, he played in the punk rock band Flipper, and in 2011 he contributed bass and accordion to the song "I Should Have Known" on the Foo Fighters' studio album Wasting Light. Since 2017, he has played bass and accordion for the band Giants in the Trees.

Outside of music, Novoselic has been active politically, being involved in the formation of a PAC named JAMPAC (Joint Artists and Musicians Political Action Committee). From 2007 through 2010, he wrote a weekly column on music and politics for the Seattle Weekly website. He served on the board of the electoral reform organization FairVote from 2005 to 2019, including 11 years as chair, and in 2020 became board chair of Zócalo Public Square.

Early life 
Krist Anthony Novoselic was born in Compton, California, on May 16, 1965, the son of Croatian immigrants Kristo Novaselić and Marija Mustać. Kristo was a native of Veli Iž on the island of Iž while Marija originates from Privlaka. The original Croatian surname of Novaselić was mistakenly changed to Novoselic by a clerk when Kristo was applying for a passport to go to America. Novoselic lived in Compton for one year before his parents moved to the ethnically Croatian Los Angeles neighborhood of San Pedro. His first language is Croatian. He has a younger brother, Robert (born 1968), and a younger sister, Diana (born 1973). In 1979, his family relocated to Aberdeen, Washington due to surging real estate costs in California. In 1980, his parents sent him to live with relatives in Zadar, Croatia. He returned to Aberdeen in 1981. His earliest memory of listening to music is listening to Chuck Berry with his father. Growing up, he had a severe underbite, for which he underwent corrective surgery.

Novoselic was interested in bands such as Led Zeppelin, Black Sabbath, The Who, Van Halen, Devo, and Aerosmith. He also enjoyed listening to Yugoslavian bands such as Zabranjeno Pušenje, Prljavo kazalište and Azra. In Croatia, he became interested in punk rock, and discovered bands such as the Sex Pistols and Ramones when he lived in Croatia at the age of 14 for one year. He has cited Paul McCartney, Geezer Butler, John Entwistle, and Gene Simmons as the fundamental influences of his bass playing.

Novoselic's brother Robert introduced him to his friend Kurt Cobain, who had noticed loud music coming from upstairs in the Novoselic household. Robert told Cobain that it was his older brother, who listened to punk rock. Cobain eventually befriended the older Novoselic, as the pair had similar musical tastes, including a fondness for local band Melvins. The two had several mutual friends and began hanging out shortly thereafter. Krist attended Aberdeen High School while Kurt attended high school in nearby Montesano. At one point, Cobain gave Novoselic a demo tape of his former band Fecal Matter, and asked him to form a band together. After several months, Novoselic finally listened to the tape, liked it, and agreed to start a band with Cobain. After high school, Novoselic worked as a painter and decorator but was eventually laid off.

Career

Nirvana (1987–1994)
	 
Cobain and Novoselic's first band lasted barely a few weeks before it disbanded, leaving the pair to move on. However, the duo eventually discovered that Melvins could pull $80 a night for one show. Inspired, Cobain and Novoselic started a Creedence Clearwater Revival cover band, in which Cobain played drums and Novoselic sang and played guitar. That band was short-lived as well. Some months later, Cobain and Novoselic met drummer Aaron Burckhard. While the new band never used the name, it was the first incarnation of Nirvana.
	 
Burckhard lasted only a few months and Melvins' drummer Dale Crover filled in until Novoselic and Cobain met Chad Channing. The trio recorded their debut album Bleach, released in 1989. Channing left the band in 1990 and was briefly replaced by Crover and Mudhoney drummer Dan Peters. Novoselic contributed to the writing of various songs, providing ideas for Cobain.

Later in 1990, Melvins' singer-guitarist Buzz Osborne encouraged Novoselic and Cobain to check out a punk band called Scream. The pair were impressed by their drummer, Dave Grohl. A few weeks later, Scream disbanded, and Grohl placed a call to Osborne for advice. Osborne gave him Novoselic's phone number, and Novoselic invited Grohl up to Seattle (from San Francisco, where Scream broke up). Grohl passed the audition and joined Nirvana. Grohl was Nirvana's fifth and final drummer. Novoselic spent the following months with Nirvana traveling to various labels as the band shopped for a deal, eventually signing with DGC Records.

In the spring of 1991, the band entered Sound City Studios in Los Angeles to record Nevermind. Novoselic helped write the song "Polly". Upon its release, Nevermind (1991) exceeded all expectations and became a worldwide commercial success. Nevermind had launched the band as a worldwide phenomenon with their hit single "Smells Like Teen Spirit".

At the 1992 MTV Video Music Awards, Nirvana would win awards for Best New Artist in a Video and Best Alternative Video for "Smells Like Teen Spirit." At the show, Nirvana performed "Lithium". When Novoselic started playing the opening bass riff, he signaled that he could not hear his bass. Instead of continuing to play, Novoselic threw his bass guitar in the air, to perform a "Bass Toss". He failed to catch it, later stating that he misjudged the height; he further stated that he "faked like he was knocked out." Musician Brian May ran to give him medical attention; he did not suffer any injuries.

In 1992, Novoselic and the rest of Nirvana released a compilation album named Incesticide. Novoselic helped write lyrics for the songs "Dive", "Hairspray Queen", and "Aneurysm" on the album. This album was produced by a joint venture between DGC and Sub Pop.

During Nirvana's 1992 Reading concert, Novoselic sang Oakland punk band 'Fang's' "The Money Will Roll Right In" with Cobain. Novoselic was an occasional vocalist and backing vocalist in Nirvana, occasionally singing "Scoff" and "Rape Me" at live shows. Novoselic stated that "I kind of discovered my voice for the first time, and the more I did it, the better it got."

In September 1993, Nirvana's third album In Utero, debuted at number one on the Billboard 200. However, the recording sessions mixed by Steve Albini were criticized by the band members, saying some songs "didn't sound perfect", as well as the band agreeing that Novoselic's bass lines sounded "too low". In Utero sold 3.5 million copies in the United States. In November of that year, Nirvana performed on MTV Unplugged with Lori Goldston playing cello, the introduction of guitarist Pat Smear, and Novoselic playing acoustic bass guitar, accordion, and acoustic rhythm guitar. This live performance was released a year later as an album, named MTV Unplugged in New York, which earned a Grammy Award for Best Alternative Music Performance.

Prior to their 1994 European tour, the band scheduled session time at Robert Lang Studios in Seattle to work on demos. For most of the three-day session, Cobain was absent, so Novoselic and Grohl worked on demos of their own songs. The duo completed several songs, including "Exhausted", "Big Me", "February Stars", and "Butterflies". On the third day of the session, Cobain finally arrived. The song "You Know You're Right" was the band's final studio recording.

Nirvana ended abruptly in April 1994 following Cobain's death. For most of the rest of that year, Novoselic retreated from the spotlight. One of a few public appearances came that September at the MTV Video Music Awards, where the video for Nirvana's "Heart-Shaped Box" was awarded for Best Alternative Video. Novoselic took the opportunity to pay tribute to Cobain.

Following the end of Nirvana, Novoselic worked on completing the With the Lights Out box set and From the Muddy Banks of the Wishkah album, as well as pushing for release of a 20th anniversary album for Nevermind.

Post-Nirvana (1995–present)
After Cobain's death, Novoselic continued to dabble in musical endeavors. He co-formed the band Sweet 75 with Venezuelan musician Yva Las Vegass in 1995, releasing a single self-titled album in 1997. In 1996, Novoselic joined singer Johnny Cash, guitarist Kim Thayil of Soundgarden and drummer Sean Kinney of Alice in Chains to record a cover of Willie Nelson's "Time of the Preacher", for the tribute album Twisted Willie, released in January 1996. In 1998, Novoselic directed his first movie, L7: The Beauty Process, a pseudo-documentary that utilizes concert footage taped in 1997 in three American cities. In 1999, he joined Jello Biafra and Soundgarden guitarist Kim Thayil in the No WTO Combo.

In 2002, Novoselic performed uncredited background vocals on Foo Fighters' song "Walking a Line", written as a tribute to Cobain, during the One by One album sessions. The track is included on the One by One bonus DVD, as well as being a bonus track to the album. He then joined former Meat Puppets front man Curt Kirkwood and former Sublime drummer Bud Gaugh to form Eyes Adrift. In Australia, there was another group called "Eyes Adrift", and rather than pay to license that name, the trio called the band and album "Bud, Curt & Krist" in this nation. Eyes Adrift released a self-titled album with twelve songs, with the Japanese version including two extras. Eyes Adrift was the first official release in Krist's career where he sang lead vocals, singing lead on "Inquiring Minds", "Dottie Dawn & Julie Jewel" and "Pasted". They also released a single named Alaska. He also took a highly active role in the songwriting process, co-writing several songs with Kirkwood. They toured mostly around the United States. The group disbanded in 2003.

Following the end of Eyes Adrift, Novoselic announced that he was quitting the music business, noting that he disliked the process of building up publicity for new records. However, in 2005, Novoselic had occasionally worked on music for a possible solo album, noting, "Right now, I'm just doing it for myself, and that's what it's all about."

In November 2006, it was announced that Novoselic would join Flipper, replacing Bruno DeSmartas on bass, for a tour of the United Kingdom and Ireland. He was a full-time member of the band and had been working on their new album. On September 22, 2008, because of responsibilities at home, Novoselic announced his departure from the band. As a result, the band canceled the remainder of the tour. Rachel Thoele then replaced Novoselic.

In 2009, Novoselic played a newspaper vendor in the movie World's Greatest Dad starring Robin Williams. In October 2010, Dave Grohl, former Nirvana bandmate of Novoselic, announced live on BBC radio, that Novoselic would be joining Foo Fighters as a bassist and accordionist on their next album, Wasting Light, which was released in 2011. Novoselic also played bass on children's music artist Caspar Babypants' 2010 album This Is Fun!, for a cover of the Nirvana song "Sliver". In 2011, he performed "On a Plain" and "Sliver" with the band at the Nevermind 20th anniversary celebration in Seattle.

In 2012, Novoselic and Grohl partnered with Paul McCartney on the song "Cut Me Some Slack", which was composed specially for the soundtrack of the documentary Sound City, directed by Grohl. The song was first shown on December 12, 2012, at the 12-12-12 festival, which brought together music stars for the victims of Hurricane Sandy in New York. The song was received well by critics. Allmusic called it a "tune with an immediate hook [and] melody". The song won the Grammy award for Best Rock Song in 2014. The partnership was referred to as "Sirvana" by Novoselic, referring to "Sir Paul McCartney".

On April 17, 2016, Novoselic performed "Helter Skelter" with Paul McCartney in Seattle as part of the One on One tour. In November 2016, Novoselic confirmed that he was in the process of writing new music. His current band is Giants in the Trees, formed in 2017, with band members Jillian Raye, Erik Friend and Ray Prestegard. He is also in the band Filthy Friends, playing bass and accordion. He also collaborates with Lepidopterist and author Robert Michael Pyle with the musical project Butterfly Launches from Spar Pole. In late July 2017, Giants in the Trees released their first song, "Sasquatch", which features a music video Novoselic joked as "costing over 2 million U.S. dollars to produce". Giants in the Trees' first album was released in late 2017. Giants In The Trees' second album, Volume 2, was released in 2019.

Novoselic has been currently working with musicians such as Soundgarden's Kim Thayil, alongside Matt Cameron, with production being handled by Jack Endino, as a new band, called 3rd Secret. A self-titled album was released in April 2022, with eleven songs recorded at The Bait Shop, in Ballard, Washington, as well as Novoselic's home.

Performance and recording with Foo Fighters
In 1994, Grohl founded a new band, Foo Fighters. He and Novoselic decided against Novoselic joining; Grohl said it would have felt "really natural" for them to work together again, but would have been uncomfortable for the other band members and placed more pressure on Grohl.

During the encore of the Foo Fighters' show on August 29, 1997 at Memorial Stadium as part of the Bumbershoot festival, Novoselic played bass on covers of "Purple Rain" and "Communication Breakdown". In January 2002, Novoselic performed backing vocals for a non-album Foo Fighters track titled "Walking a Line", later released on a special edition of their album One by One.

During the encore of Foo Fighters' secret show at Paladino's in Tarzana, California on December 22, 2010, the band, with Grohl on drums, was joined onstage by Novoselic and the band's live guitarist Pat Smear for a version of Nirvana's "Marigold", a 1992 Grohl original, which was a B-side on Nirvana's "Heart-Shaped Box". Novoselic also recorded bass and accordion for the song "I Should Have Known", appearing on Foo Fighters' seventh studio album Wasting Light.

On December 5, 2017, Novoselic joined Foo Fighters on stage at Matthew Knight Arena in Eugene, Oregon, to play bass guitar on "Big Me", a song from the Foo Fighters' debut album Foo Fighters. Ten months later, on October 6, 2018, Novoselic joined the band during an encore to play several Nirvana songs, with Grohl on drums, Pat Smear on guitar, and John J. McCauley and Joan Jett filling in as their lead singer.

Political and social activism

A lifelong independent, Krist Novoselic was interested in politics at a very young age; this included the Northern Ireland conflict between Irish Nationalists and Unionists in Northern Ireland.

In 1992, the Washington State Legislature attempted to pass a bill called the Erotic Music Law. The law would allow courts to declare certain albums "erotic" due to their content, and would make it illegal to sell those albums to anyone under the age of 18. A lobbying group called the Washington Music Industry Coalition formed as a response to the bill. Novoselic and Nirvana actively campaigned against the bill and performed a benefit concert for the lobbying group in September 1992. Krist appeared on KOMO-TVs Town Meeting as part of the campaign against this bill.

In 1995, the Erotic Music Law was reintroduced to the Washington State Legislature as the Matters Harmful to Minors bill. Noting that the music industry had serious clout in Seattle given the success of the grunge scene, Novoselic proposed creating a political action committee, which was named JAMPAC (Joint Artists and Musicians Political Action Committee). Over the next several years, JAMPAC fought a number of different issues, including the Teen Dance Ordinance, a 1985 law that strictly limited the ability of minors to attend shows. With JAMPAC, Novoselic began to turn his focus more and more towards politics.

Novoselic remains active in politics, advocating for electoral reform (especially instant-runoff voting and proportional representation). He considered a 2004 run for Lieutenant Governor of Washington as a Democrat, challenging an incumbent of the same party, but ultimately decided against it. He also joined the board of FairVote (then the Center for Voting and Democracy) and was appointed chair in January 2008.

Novoselic's first book, Of Grunge and Government: Let's Fix This Broken Democracy, was published in October 2004. It covers Novoselic's musical past, including Nirvana's rise to a worldwide phenomenon in the early 1990s. It also covers his interest in politics, his support of electoral reform, and his belief in the need to return to grassroots movements and clean up politics overall.

He supported Democratic Senator Barack Obama in the 2008 presidential election, and in the primary. He has since broken with the Democratic Party, partly because "it's a top-down structure" averse to reform from its grassroots. In 2007, he made a donation to libertarian Republican Congressman Ron Paul.

He withdrew from the campaign for county clerk of Wahkiakum County. He was running under the "Grange Party," a reference to his membership in the National Grange of the Order of Patrons of Husbandry, although there  is no such party. His run was intended as a protest against Washington State's party system, in which a candidate can claim any party (real or fictional) as their own without consent or support from the party. Novoselic continues to support political reform, even looking at social networks such as Facebook and Twitter as major factors in shaping the political future. He explained his support for fair voting reforms on C-SPAN's Washington Journal in 2012.

In an interview for Reason TV, Novoselic was asked how he described his political views, and he responded, "I'm an anarcho-capitalist, socialist, moderate... I don't know" and continued to say that while his political views couldn't be easily categorized, he finds fault in the political philosophies of both the left and right-wing. On his blog, he supported Lawrence Lessig and his political campaign.

During the 2016 U.S. presidential campaign, Novoselic publicly supported and campaigned for Libertarian candidate Gary Johnson.

In June 2020, Novoselic made a Facebook post discussing President Donald Trump's speech in response to unrest following the murder of George Floyd. He called Trump "strong and direct" but added that he "should not be sending troops into states". Following criticism, Novoselic made his Facebook page private and deleted his Twitter account. After receiving backlash for the original post, Novoselic clarified: "As an avowed independent, I don't endorse a major party or candidate. And it feels insane to have to say this, but I don't support fascism, and I don't support an authoritarian state. I believe in a civilized society and that we all have to work toward that."

In other media
In 2004 Novoselic wrote a book titled: Of Grunge and Government: Let's Fix This Broken Democracy!. The book is 103 pages long and is based around two main topics. One is about his days in Nirvana and relationship with Kurt Cobain. The other is his political side, describing his development as a political activist and stating why electoral reform is needed in particular proportional representation and instant runoff voting.

In November 2007, Novoselic started writing blogs for the Seattle Weekly website. He stopped writing for Seattle Weekly in September 2010.

Since 2007, Novoselic has been the DJ numerous times for Coast radio on KMUN.

Novoselic had a brief cameo in Bobcat Goldthwait's 2009 film World's Greatest Dad as a newspaper vendor.

In 2014, ahead of Nirvana's induction into the Rock and Roll Hall of Fame, Novoselic and Dave Grohl made guest appearances on The Tonight Show Starring Jimmy Fallon.

Novoselic has a blog entitled "Dream Journal".

Personal life
In 1989, Novoselic married Shelli Hyrkas, whom he had dated in high school. They divorced in 1999. In early 2004, he married American artist Darbury Ayn Stenderu. Together they have two children. They reside on a farm near Deep River, Washington, where they grow their own food. Novoselic stated, "I live out in the country now and it's quiet and it's a place where I can think a lot."

Novoselic is an FAA-licensed pilot, earning a single-engine land rating after passing his flight test in April 2002. He went on to earn a multi-engine pilot certificate in February 2018. He has a strong interest in animals, geology, nature, and other sciences.

In 2016, Novoselic earned a BSc in social sciences from Washington State University Global Campus.

As of 2022, as stated on his website, Novoselic is working towards Environmental Justice for his MSL degree.

Discography

With Nirvana

 Bleach (1989)
 Nevermind (1991)
 In Utero (1993)

With Sweet 75
 Sweet 75 (1997)

With the No WTO Combo
 Live from the Battle in Seattle (2000)

With Eyes Adrift
 Eyes Adrift (2002)

With Flipper
 Love (2009)
 Fight (2009)

With Filthy Friends
 Invitation (2017)

With Giants in the Trees
 Giants in the Trees (2017)
 Volume 2 (2019)

With Butterfly Launches From Spar Pole
 Butterfly Launches From Spar Pole (2019)

With 3rd Secret
 3rd Secret (2022)

Collaborations

References

Notes

 Bloch-Garcia, Peter. "Kick Out the Jams". Real Change News. 2000.

Further reading
 The Best of Nirvana: A Step-by-Step Breakdown of the Bass Styles & Techniques of Chris Novoselic (July 2003) 
 Of Grunge and Government: Let's Fix This Broken Democracy (January 2004) 
 Taboo Tunes: A History of Banned Bands & Censored Songs (April 2004) 
 Nirvana: The Biography (March 2007) 
 Kurt Cobain and Nirvana - Updated Edition: The Complete Illustrated History (September 2016)

External links

 
 Grammy Awards profile
 
 
 FairVote profile 
 Audio interview "Krist Novoselic Talks About Nirvana, Flipper, Bomb, and His Ideas On Changing Democracy" 

1965 births
American accordionists
Acoustic guitarists
American alternative rock musicians
American bloggers
American democracy activists
American male non-fiction writers
American political writers
American people of Croatian descent
American punk rock bass guitarists
American rock bass guitarists
American rock guitarists
American rock singers
American male guitarists
Background artists
Bass guitarists
Flipper (band) members
Grammy Award winners
Grunge musicians
Guitarists from California
Living people
American male bass guitarists
Musicians from Seattle
Nirvana (band) members
American organists
American male organists
People from Greater Los Angeles
People from Aberdeen, Washington
People from Compton, California
Politicians from Seattle
Sub Pop artists
Washington (state) Independents
American social scientists
21st-century American non-fiction writers
21st-century accordionists
People from Wahkiakum County, Washington
American male bloggers
21st-century organists
Eyes Adrift members
American libertarians
Filthy Friends members
3rd Secret members